Hustead is an unincorporated community in Clark County, in the U.S. state of Ohio.

History
A post office called Hustead was established in 1868, and remained in operation until 1914. The community was named for the local Hustead family.

References

Unincorporated communities in Clark County, Ohio
1868 establishments in Ohio
Unincorporated communities in Ohio